Thee Legacy is a distinctly South African contemporary Isicathamiya acappella group. They rose to stardom as a result of winning the inaugural Sing Off South Africa 2015 a cappella music competition, which aired on SABC 1 and earned them a recording deal with Sony Music Entertainment Africa. Thee Legacy comprises Jabulani Mthembu, Khanyisani Mazibuko, Philani Duma, Emille Ngcobo and Simphiwe Sikhakhane who all hail from the INK area (Inanda, Ntuzuma, KwaMashu) in KwaZulu Natal.

Thee Legacy were nominated at the 16th Metro FM Music Awards in the Best Remix category for radio charting singles "Wena Wedwa" (MusicCraftMAN Mix) and "S’thandwa Sami" (Mr Kamera Remix); making them the only artists to receive more than one nomination in the same MMA16 category this year. Thee Legacy’s Wena Wedwa (MusicCraftMAN Mix) is also featured as a soundtrack to the latest Simba Mapha TVC.

Their self-titled debut album was released in October 2016.

Background 
Thee Legacy was started by Jabulani Mthembu (group leader) with the help of his brother in 2009. When the group started in 2009 it was called Young Mbazo, as some of the members in the group are related to Ladysmith Black Mambazo; namely Jabulani Mthembu whose grandfather, Russel Mthembu, is part of Lady Smith Black Mambazo and Khanyisani Mazibuko whose father, Albert Mazibuko, is also a member of Lady Smith Black Mambazo.

Before entering The Sing Off South Africa competition in 2015 the group consisted of more than five members. Due to the competition requirements they had to remove some members, as the competition required a maximum of five members. Jabulani Mthembu decided to eventually change the name because he didn’t want it to look like they were just following in their grandparents’ footsteps, that they would be under their shadow; and so The Legacy was born which developed into Thee Legacy after winning the inaugural Sing Off South Africa competition.

Having released the self-titled debut album Thee Legacy, the group released the single "Wena Wedwa", a follow up to their debut "Sthandwa Sami" single which made them the inaugural winners of The Sing Off South Africa 2015. In 2016 the group partnered with Victory “Vix” Chauke from MusicCraftsMan to create the remix of "Wena Wedwa" which has an R&B and Afro Beat sound. The song led to the group's collaboration with the South African heritage brand, Simba, as they provided the soundtrack to the latest Simba Mapha TVC, as Simba celebrated its 60-year anniversary.

Achievements 

 2016: Received two Metro FM Music Award (MMA16) nominations both in the category for Best Remix for hit singles Wena Wedwa (MusicCraftMAN Mix) and S’thandwa Sami (Mr Kamera Remix); making them the only artists to receive more than one nomination in the same category at MMA16
 2016: Their single Wena Wedwa (MusicCraftMAN Mix) was selected as the soundtrack to the latest Simba Mapha TVC 
 2016: Their single Wena Wedwa (MusicCraftMAN Mix) peaked at #8 on the RAMS Top 100 Chart
 2016: Their single Wena Wedwa (MusicCraftMAN Mix) peaked at #1 on the Ukhozi Top 20 Chart
 2016: Selected as the New Artist Spotlight by Apple Music
 2016: Their music was selected for inclusion on the soundtrack to local film Wonder Boy produced by Kagiso Lediga
 2016: Featured on the Afro Café Heritage Day special on SABC 2
 2016: Released their debut self-titled album, Thee Legacy
 2015: Signed to Sony Music Entertainment Africa
 2015: Inaugural  winners of The Sing Off South Africa

Award nominations 

 2017: Metro FM Music Award (MMA16) Best Remix – Wena Wedwa (MusicCraftMAN Mix)
 2017: Metro FM Music Award (MMA16) Best Remix – S’thandwa Sami (Mr Kamera Remix)

Discography 

Studio album
 Thee Legacy (2016)

References 

A cappella musical groups
Zulu music